The Bay Valley Conference is an all-sport conference within the California Community College Athletic Association.

References

College sports in California
CCCAA conferences
College sports conferences in the United States